The 2012–13 Montreal Canadiens season was the 104th season of play for the franchise that was founded on December 4, 1909, and its 96th season in the National Hockey League (NHL). The regular season was reduced from its usual 82 games to 48 due to a lockout.

Off-season
After a disappointing 2011–12 season, the Canadiens started over in the front office. Marc Bergevin was named the new general manager on May 2, 2012. Rick Dudley was then named as the assistant general manager. The search then began for a new head coach and on June 5, Michel Therrien was named the new head coach. This would be Therrien's second stint as the Canadiens head coach (previously coached team from 2000 to 2003) Scott Mellanby was hired as the director of player personnel and Randy Cunneyworth and Randy Ladouceur were relieved of their assistant coaching duties. Some other hockey operations changes included the hiring of Martin Lapointe as director of player development, Patrice Brisebois was hired as a player development coach and on June 15, Gerard Gallant, J. J. Daigneault and Clement Jodoin were added to Montreal's coaching staff as assistant coaches.

Montreal held the third overall pick in the 2012 NHL Entry Draft and selected Alex Galchenyuk from the Sarnia Sting.

|- bgcolor=
| 1 || September 23 || Ottawa || Montreal ||
|- bgcolor=
| 2 || September 24 || Buffalo || Montreal ||
|- bgcolor=
| 3 || September 27 || Montreal ||  Ottawa ||
|- bgcolor=
| 4 || October 2 || Montreal || Carolina ||
|- bgcolor=
| 5 || October 3 || Carolina ||  Montreal ||
|- bgcolor=
| 6 || October 6 || Boston ||  Montreal ||
|- bgcolor=
| 7 || October 7 || New Jersey ||  Montreal ||
|-

|- style="text-align:center;" bgcolor=
| 1 || October 11 ||Ottawa  || Montreal ||
|- style="text-align:center;" bgcolor=
| 2 || October 13 ||Montreal  || Toronto ||
|- style="text-align:center;" bgcolor=
| 3 || October 16 ||Boston  || Montreal ||
|- style="text-align:center;" bgcolor=
| 4 || October 18 ||Montreal || Boston ||
|- style="text-align:center;" bgcolor=
| 5 || October 20 ||Washington  || Montreal ||
|- style="text-align:center;" bgcolor=
| 6 || October 23 ||Montreal  || Minnesota ||
|- style="text-align:center;" bgcolor=
| 7 || October 25 ||Philadelphia  || Montreal ||
|- style="text-align:center;" bgcolor=
| 8 || October 27 ||Anaheim || Montreal ||
|- style="text-align:center;" bgcolor=
| 9 || October 30 ||Montreal  || Calgary ||
|-

|- style="text-align:center;" bgcolor=
| 10 || November 1 || Montreal || Edmonton ||
|- style="text-align:center;" bgcolor=
| 11 || November 3 || Montreal || Vancouver ||
|- style="text-align:center;" bgcolor=
| 12 || November 6 || Phoenix ||  Montreal ||
|- style="text-align:center;" bgcolor=
| 13 || November 8 || Winnipeg ||  Montreal ||
|- style="text-align:center;" bgcolor=
| 14 || November 10 || NY Rangers || Montreal ||
|- style="text-align:center;" bgcolor=
| 15 || November 13 || Calgary ||   Montreal ||
|- style="text-align:center;" bgcolor=
| 16 || November 15 || Montreal ||   Winnipeg ||
|- style="text-align:center;" bgcolor=
| 17 || November 17 || Montreal ||   Colorado ||
|- style="text-align:center;" bgcolor=
| 18 || November 19 || Nashville ||  Montreal ||
|- style="text-align:center;" bgcolor=
| 19 || November 20 || Montreal ||  New Jersey ||
|- style="text-align:center;" bgcolor=
| 20 || November 24 || Vancouver ||  Montreal ||
|- style="text-align:center;" bgcolor=
| 21 || November 27 || Tampa Bay  || Montreal ||
|-

|- style="text-align:center;" bgcolor=
| 22 || December 1 || Toronto ||  Montreal ||
|- style="text-align:center;" bgcolor=
| 23 || December 2 || Montreal ||  Columbus ||
|- style="text-align:center;" bgcolor=
| 24 || December 4 || Chicago ||  Montreal ||
|- style="text-align:center;" bgcolor=
| 25 || December 6 || Montreal ||  Buffalo ||
|- style="text-align:center;" bgcolor=
| 26 || December 8 || Buffalo ||  Montreal ||
|- style="text-align:center;" bgcolor=
| 27 || December 10 || Carolina || Montreal ||
|- style="text-align:center;" bgcolor=
| 28 || December 12 || Montreal || NY Rangers ||
|- style="text-align:center;" bgcolor=
| 29 || December 13 || Los Angeles || Montreal ||
|- style="text-align:center;" bgcolor=
| 30 || December 15 || Montreal ||  Buffalo ||
|- style="text-align:center;" bgcolor=
| 31 || December 17 || Buffalo ||  Montreal ||
|- style="text-align:center;" bgcolor=
| 32 || December 19 || Montreal || Ottawa ||
|- style="text-align:center;" bgcolor=
| 33 || December 20 || Montreal || Washington ||
|- style="text-align:center;" bgcolor=
| 34 || December 22 || Montreal || Toronto ||
|- style="text-align:center;" bgcolor=
| 35 || December 27 || Montreal ||  Tampa Bay ||
|- style="text-align:center;" bgcolor=
| 36 || December 28 || Montreal ||  Florida ||
|- style="text-align:center;" bgcolor=
| 37 || December 31 || Montreal ||  Carolina ||
|-

|- style="text-align:center;" bgcolor=
| 38 || January 3 || New Jersey || Montreal ||
|- style="text-align:center;" bgcolor=
| 39 || January 5 || Toronto  || Montreal ||
|- style="text-align:center;" bgcolor=
| 40 || January 8 || Florida || Montreal ||
|- style="text-align:center;" bgcolor=
| 41 || January 10 || Montreal ||  Philadelphia ||
|- style="text-align:center;" bgcolor=
| 42 || January 12 || Montreal || Dallas ||
|- style="text-align:center;" bgcolor=
| 43 || January 13 || Montreal || St. Louis ||
|- style="text-align:center;" bgcolor=
| 44 || January 16 || Pittsburgh || Montreal ||
|- style="text-align:center;" bgcolor=
| 45 || January 18 || Montreal || Pittsburgh ||
|- style="text-align:center;" bgcolor=
| 46 || January 19 || Boston || Montreal ||
|- style="text-align:center;" bgcolor=
| 47 || January 22 || Tampa Bay || Montreal ||
|- style="text-align:center;" bgcolor=
| 48 || January 29 || Edmonton ||  Montreal ||
|- style="text-align:center;" bgcolor=
| 49 || January 30 || Montreal ||  Detroit ||
|-

|- style="text-align:center;" bgcolor=
| 50 || February 2 || NY Islanders ||  Montreal ||
|- style="text-align:center;" bgcolor=
| 51 || February 3 || Ottawa ||  Montreal ||
|- style="text-align:center;" bgcolor=
| 52 || February 6 || Carolina ||  Montreal ||
|- style="text-align:center;" bgcolor=
| 53 || February 8 || Montreal ||  Pittsburgh ||
|- style="text-align:center;" bgcolor=
| 54 || February 9 || Toronto ||  Montreal ||
|- style="text-align:center;" bgcolor=
| 55 || February 12 || Montreal ||  NY Islanders ||
|- style="text-align:center;" bgcolor=
| 56 || February 15 || Montreal ||  Buffalo ||
|- style="text-align:center;" bgcolor=
| 57 || February 17 || Montreal ||  Winnipeg ||
|- style="text-align:center;" bgcolor=
| 58 || February 19 || San Jose ||  Montreal ||
|- style="text-align:center;" bgcolor=
| 59 || February 20 || Montreal || NY Rangers ||
|- style="text-align:center;" bgcolor=
| 60 || February 23 || Pittsburgh || Montreal ||
|- style="text-align:center;" bgcolor=
| 61 || February 25 || Montreal ||  Ottawa ||
|- style="text-align:center;" bgcolor=
| 62 || February 28 || Boston ||  Montreal ||
|-

|- style="text-align:center;" bgcolor=
| 63 || March 2 || NY Islanders  || Montreal ||
|- style="text-align:center;" bgcolor=
| 64 || March 4 || Montreal ||   Boston ||
|- style="text-align:center;" bgcolor=
| 65 || March 7 || Montreal ||   Washington ||
|- style="text-align:center;" bgcolor=
| 66 || March 9 || Montreal ||   Tampa Bay ||
|- style="text-align:center;" bgcolor=
| 67 || March 10 || Montreal ||   Florida ||
|- style="text-align:center;" bgcolor=
| 68 || March 13 || Ottawa ||   Montreal ||
|- style="text-align:center;" bgcolor=
| 69 || March 15 || Montreal ||   Philadelphia ||
|- style="text-align:center;" bgcolor=
| 70 || March 16 || Montreal ||   New Jersey ||
|- style="text-align:center;" bgcolor=
| 71 || March 19 || Montreal ||   Ottawa ||
|- style="text-align:center;" bgcolor=
| 72 || March 21 || New Jersey ||   Montreal ||
|- style="text-align:center;" bgcolor=
| 73 || March 23 || Montreal ||   NY Islanders ||
|- style="text-align:center;" bgcolor=
| 74 || March 26 || Winnipeg ||   Montreal ||
|- style="text-align:center;" bgcolor=
| 75 || March 27 || Montreal ||   Winnipeg ||
|- style="text-align:center;" bgcolor=
| 76 || March 30 || NY Rangers ||   Montreal ||
|-

|- style="text-align:center;" bgcolor=
| 77 || April 2 || Philadelphia  || Montreal ||
|- style="text-align:center;" bgcolor=
| 78 || April 4 || Washington   || Montreal ||
|- style="text-align:center;" bgcolor=
| 79 || April 6 || Buffalo ||   Montreal ||
|- style="text-align:center;" bgcolor=
| 80 || April 9 || Florida ||  Montreal ||
|- style="text-align:center;" bgcolor=
| 81 || April 12 || Montreal ||  Carolina ||
|- style="text-align:center;" bgcolor=
| 82 || April 13 || Montreal ||  Toronto ||
|-

Regular season
The Canadiens had the most power-play opportunities during the regular season, with 207. They also tied the Tampa Bay Lightning for the fewest shorthanded goals scored, with zero.

Standings

Revised regular season schedule

|-  style="text-align:center; background:#fcc;"
| 1 || 19 || 7:00 pm || Toronto Maple Leafs || 2–1 || Montreal Canadiens || Bell Centre (21,273) || 0–1–0 || 0
|-  style="text-align:center; background:#cfc;"
| 2 || 22 || 7:30 pm || Florida Panthers || 1–4 || Montreal Canadiens || Bell Centre (21,273) || 1–1–0 || 2
|-  style="text-align:center; background:#cfc;"
| 3 || 24 || 7:00 pm || Montreal Canadiens || 4–1 || Washington Capitals || Verizon Center (18,506) || 2–1–0 || 4
|-  style="text-align:center; background:#cfc;"
| 4 || 27 || 6:00 pm || New Jersey Devils || 3–4(OT) || Montreal Canadiens || Bell Centre (21,273) || 3–1–0 || 6
|-  style="text-align:center; background:#cfc;"
| 5 || 29 || 7:30 pm || Winnipeg Jets || 3–4 || Montreal Canadiens || Bell Centre (21,273) || 4–1–0 || 8
|-  style="text-align:center; background:#fcc;"
| 6 || 30 || 7:00 pm || Montreal Canadiens || 1–5 || Ottawa Senators || Scotiabank Place (19,620) || 4–2–0 || 8
|- style="text-align:center;"
| colspan=9 | Legend:       = Win       = Loss       = OT/SO Loss
|-

|-  style="text-align:center; background:#cfc;"
| 7 || 2 || 2:00 pm || Buffalo Sabres || 1–6 || Montreal Canadiens || Bell Centre (21,273) || 5–2–0 || 10
|-  style="text-align:center; background:#cfc;"
| 8 || 3 || 2:00 pm || Ottawa Senators || 1–2 || Montreal Canadiens || Bell Centre (21,273) || 6–2–0 || 12
|-  style="text-align:center; background:#fcc;"
| 9 || 6 || 7:30 pm || Boston Bruins || 2–1 || Montreal Canadiens || Bell Centre (21,273) || 6–3–0 || 12
|-  style="text-align:center; background:#ffc;"
| 10 || 7 || 7:00 pm || Montreal Canadiens || 4–5 (SO) || Buffalo Sabres || First Niagara Center (18,866) || 6–3–1 || 13
|-  style="text-align:center; background:#fcc;"
| 11 || 9 || 7:00 pm || Toronto Maple Leafs || 6–0 || Montreal Canadiens || Bell Centre (21,273)|| 6–4–1 || 13
|-  style="text-align:center; background:#cfc;"
| 12 || 12 || 7:30 pm || Montreal Canadiens || 4–3(SO) || Tampa Bay Lightning || Tampa Bay Times Forum  (19,204)|| 7–4–1 || 15
|-  style="text-align:center; background:#cfc;"
| 13 || 14 || 7:30 pm || Montreal Canadiens || 1–0(OT) || Florida Panthers || BB&T Center (17,204) || 8–4–1 || 17
|-  style="text-align:center; background:#cfc;"
| 14 || 16 || 7:00 pm || Philadelphia Flyers || 1–4 || Montreal Canadiens || Bell Centre (21,273) || 9–4–1 || 19
|-  style="text-align:center; background:#cfc;"
| 15 || 18 || 7:30 pm || Carolina Hurricanes || 0–3 || Montreal Canadiens || Bell Centre (21,273)|| 10–4–1 || 21
|-  style="text-align:center; background:#cfc;"
| 16 || 19 || 7:00 pm || Montreal Canadiens ||  3–1 || New York Rangers || Madison Square Garden (17,200) || 11–4–1 || 23
|-  style="text-align:center; background:#ffc;"
| 17 || 21 || 7:30 pm || New York Islanders || 4–3(OT) || Montreal Canadiens || Bell Centre (21,273) || 11–4–2 || 24
|-  style="text-align:center; background:#cfc;"
| 18 || 23 || 7:00 pm || New York Rangers || 0–3 || Montreal Canadiens || Bell Centre (21,273) || 12–4–2 || 26
|-  style="text-align:center; background:#ffc;"
| 19 || 25 || 7:30 pm || Montreal Canadiens || 1–2(SO) || Ottawa Senators || Scotiabank Place (19,218) || 12–4–3 || 27
|-  style="text-align:center; background:#cfc;"
| 20 || 27 || 7:30 pm || Montreal Canadiens || 5–2 || Toronto Maple Leafs || Air Canada Centre (19,625) || 13–4–3|| 29
|- style="text-align:center;"
| colspan=9 | Legend:       = Win       = Loss       = OT/SO Loss
|-

|-  style="text-align:center; background:#ffc;"
| 21 || 2 || 7:00 pm || Pittsburgh Penguins || 7–6(OT) || Montreal Canadiens || Bell Centre (21,273) || 13–4–4 || 30
|-  style="text-align:center; background:#cfc;"
| 22 || 3 || 7:30 pm || Montreal Canadiens || 4–3 || Boston Bruins || TD Garden (17,565) || 14–4–4 || 32
|-  style="text-align:center; background:#fcc;"
| 23 || 5 || 7:00 pm || Montreal Canadiens || 3–6 || New York Islanders || Nassau Coliseum (9,498) || 14–5–4 || 32
|-  style="text-align:center; background:#cfc;"
| 24 || 7 || 7:00 pm || Montreal Canadiens || 4–2 || Carolina Hurricanes || PNC Arena (16,774) || 15–5–4 || 34
|-  style="text-align:center; background:#cfc;"
| 25 || 9 || 7:00 pm || Montreal Canadiens || 4–3 || Tampa Bay Lightning || Tampa Bay Times Forum (19,204) || 16–5–4 || 36
|-  style="text-align:center; background:#cfc;"
| 26 || 10 || 6:00 pm || Montreal Canadiens || 5–2 || Florida Panthers || BB&T Center (19,189) || 17–5–4 || 38
|-  style="text-align:center; background:#cfc;"
| 27 || 13 || 7:00 pm || Ottawa Senators || 3–4(SO)  || Montreal Canadiens || Bell Centre (21,273) || 18–5–4 || 40
|-  style="text-align:center; background:#cfc;"
| 28 || 16 || 7:00 pm || Montreal Canadiens || 2–1 || New Jersey Devils || Prudential Center (17,625) || 19–5–4 || 42
|-  style="text-align:center; background:#ffc;"
| 29 || 19 || 7:30 pm || Buffalo Sabres || 3–2(OT) || Montreal Canadiens || Bell Centre (21,273) || 19–5–5 || 43
|-  style="text-align:center; background:#cfc;"
| 30 || 21 || 7:00 pm || Montreal Canadiens || 5–2 || New York Islanders || Nassau Veterans Memorial Coliseum (11,012) || 20–5–5 || 45
|-  style="text-align:center; background:#fcc;"
| 31 || 23 || 7:00 pm || Buffalo Sabres || 2–1 || Montreal Canadiens || Bell Centre (21,273) || 20–6–5 || 45
|-  style="text-align:center; background:#fcc;"
| 32 || 26 || 7:00 pm || Montreal Canadiens || 0–1 || Pittsburgh Penguins || Consol Energy Center (18,646) || 20–7–5 || 45
|-  style="text-align:center; background:#cfc;"
| 33 || 27 || 7:30 pm || Montreal Canadiens || 6–5(SO) || Boston Bruins || TD Garden (17,565) || 21–7–5 || 47
|-  style="text-align:center; background:#cfc;"
| 34 || 30 || 7:00 pm || New York Rangers || 0–3 || Montreal Canadiens || Bell Centre (21,273) || 22–7–5 || 49
|- style="text-align:center;"
| colspan=9 | Legend:       = Win       = Loss       = OT/SO Loss
|-

|-  style="text-align:center; background:#cfc;"
| 35 || 1 || 7:30 pm || Carolina Hurricanes || 1–4 || Montreal Canadiens || Bell Centre (21,273) || 23–7–5 || 51
|-  style="text-align:center; background:#fcc;"
| 36 || 3 || 7:30 pm || Montreal Canadiens || 3–5 || Philadelphia Flyers || Wells Fargo Center (19,537) || 23–8–5 || 51
|-  style="text-align:center; background:#cfc;"
| 37 || 4 || 7:30 pm || Winnipeg Jets || 1–4 || Montreal Canadiens || Bell Centre (21,273) || 24–8–5 || 53
|-  style="text-align:center; background:#cfc;"
| 38 || 6 || 7:00 pm || Boston Bruins || 1–2 || Montreal Canadiens || Bell Centre (21,273) || 25–8–5 || 55
|-  style="text-align:center; background:#fcc;"
| 39 || 9 || 7:30 pm || Washington Capitals || 3–2  || Montreal Canadiens || Bell Centre (21,273) || 25–9–5 || 55
|-  style="text-align:center; background:#cfc;"
| 40 || 11 || 7:30 pm || Montreal Canadiens || 5–1 || Buffalo Sabres || First Niagara Center (19,070) || 26–9–5 || 57
|-  style="text-align:center; background:#fcc;"
| 41 || 13 || 7:00 pm || Montreal Canadiens || 1–5 || Toronto Maple Leafs || Air Canada Centre (19,625) || 26–10–5 || 57
|-  style="text-align:center; background:#fcc;"
| 42 || 15 || 7:30 pm || Philadelphia Flyers || 7–3 || Montreal Canadiens || Bell Centre (21,273) || 26–11–5 || 57
|-  style="text-align:center; background:#fcc;"
| 43 || 17 || 7:00 pm || Montreal Canadiens || 4–6 || Pittsburgh Penguins || Consol Energy Center (18,626) || 26–12–5 || 57
|-  style="text-align:center; background:#cfc;"
| 44 || 18 || 7:30 pm || Tampa Bay Lightning || 2–3 || Montreal Canadiens || Bell Centre (21,273) || 27–12–5 || 59
|-  style="text-align:center; background:#fcc;"
| 45 || 20 || 7:00 pm || Washington Capitals || 5–1 || Montreal Canadiens || Bell Centre (21,273) || 27–13–5 || 59
|-  style="text-align:center; background:#fcc;"
| 46 || 23 || 7:00 pm || Montreal Canadiens || 2–3 || New Jersey Devils || Prudential Center (17,625) || 27–14–5 || 59
|-  style="text-align:center; background:#cfc;"
| 47 || 25 || 8:00 pm || Montreal Canadiens || 4–2 || Winnipeg Jets || MTS Centre || 28–14–5 || 61
|-  style="text-align:center; background:#cfc;"
| 48 || 27 || 7:00 pm || Montreal Canadiens || 4–1 || Toronto Maple Leafs || Air Canada Centre || 29–14–5 || 63
|- style="text-align:center;"
| colspan=9 | Legend:       = Win       = Loss       = OT/SO Loss
|-

Playoffs

|-  style="text-align:center; background:#fcc;"
| 1 || May 2 || 7:00 pm || Ottawa Senators || 4–2 || Montreal Canadiens || Bell Centre (21,273) || Senators lead 1–0
|-  style="text-align:center; background:#cfc;" 
| 2 || May 3 || 7:00 pm || Ottawa Senators || 1–3 || Montreal Canadiens || Bell Centre (21,273) || Series tied 1–1
|-  style="text-align:center; background:#fcc;"  
| 3 || May 5 || 7:00 pm || Montreal Canadiens || 1–6 || Ottawa Senators || Scotiabank Place (20,249) || Senators lead 2–1
|-  style="text-align:center; background:#fcc;"
| 4 || May 7 || 7:00 pm || Montreal Canadiens || 2–3 OT || Ottawa Senators || Scotiabank Place (20,500) || Senators lead 3–1
|-  style="text-align:center; background:#fcc;"
| 5 || May 9 || 7:00 pm || Ottawa Senators || 6–1 || Montreal Canadiens || Bell Centre (21,273) || Senators win 4–1
|- style="text-align:center;"
| colspan=8 | Legend:       = Win       = Loss
|-

Player statistics
Final stats
Skaters

Goaltenders

†Denotes player spent time with another team before joining the Canadiens.  Stats reflect time with the Candadiens only.
‡Denotes player was traded mid-season.  Stats reflect time with the Canadiens only.
Bold/italics denotes franchise record

Awards and honours

Awards

Milestones

Transactions 
The Canadiens have been involved in the following transactions during the 2012–13 season:

Trades

Free agents acquired

Free agents lost

Claimed via waivers

Lost via waivers

Player signings

Draft picks

Montreal Canadiens' picks at the 2012 NHL Entry Draft, held in Pittsburgh, Pennsylvania on June 22 & 23, 2012.

Draft Notes
 The Nashville Predators' second-round pick went to the Montreal Canadiens as a result of a February 17, 2012, trade that sent Hal Gill and a 2013 conditional fifth-round pick (if Blake Geoffrion plays 40 NHL games in 2012–13) to the Predators in exchange for Blake Geoffrion, Robert Slaney and this pick.
 The Columbus Blue Jackets' fifth-round pick went to the Montreal Canadiens as a result of a June 29, 2011, trade that sent James Wisniewski to the Blue Jackets in exchange for this pick.
 The Montreal Canadiens' fifth-round pick went to the Calgary Flames as the result of a January 12, 2012, trade that traded Rene Bourque, Patrick Holland and a 2013 second round pick to the Canadiens for Michael Cammalleri, Karri Ramo and this pick.
 The Montreal Canadiens' seventh-round pick went to the Phoenix Coyotes as the result of an October 23, 2011, trade that traded Petteri Nokelainen and Garrett Stafford to the Canadiens for Colin Stuart, Anton Stralman and this pick.

See also 
 2012–13 NHL season

References

External links
2012–13 Season at Official Site
2012–13 Season at ESPN
2012–13 Season at Hockey Reference

Montreal Canadiens seasons
Montreal Canadiens season, 2012-13
Montreal